Aristolochia longa, the long aristolochia or sarrasine, is a species of pipevine. It is widely used in traditional Maghreb medicine, particularly in the Mascara province, where it is used to treat skin conditions, diabetes, and cancer. It is an effective anti-fungal against the yeast Saccharomyces cerevisiae.

References

longa
Plants described in 1753
Taxa named by Carl Linnaeus